This article shows the rosters of all participating teams at the 2017 Asian Women's U23 Volleyball Championship in Nakhon Ratchasima, Thailand.

Pool A

Head coach: Nataphon Srisamutnak
The following is the Thai roster in the 2017 Asian U23 Championship.

Head coach: Cheong Ka-Chon
The following is the Thai roster in the 2017 Asian U23 Championship.

Head coach: Cheung King-Fai
The following is the Thai roster in the 2017 Asian U23 Championship.

Pool B

Head coach: Kiyoshi Abo
The following is the Japan roster in the 2017 Asian U23 Championship.

Head coach: Olga Isaenok
The following is the Thai roster in the 2017 Asian U23 Championship.

Head coach: Irisawa Hidehiro
The following is the Vietnam roster in the 2017 Asian U23 Championship.

Pool C

Head coach: Shannon Winzer
The following is the Thai roster in the 2017 Asian U23 Championship.

Head coach: Dzianis Matsveyeu
The following is the Thai roster in the 2017 Asian U23 Championship.

Head coach: Wannithila H.M.A.D.K
The following is the Thai roster in the 2017 Asian U23 Championship.

Pool D

Head coach: 
The following is the Iranian roster in the 2017 Asian U23 Championship

Head coach: 
The following is the Malaysian roster in the 2017 Asian U23 Championship

Head coach: 
The following is the New Zealand roster in the 2017 Asian U23 Championship

External links
Official website

U23, 2017
2017 in Thai sport
Women's volleyball in Thailand
International volleyball competitions hosted by Thailand
Sport in Nakhon Ratchasima province